The Penticton Indian Band is a First Nations government in the Canadian province of British Columbia, located next to the city of Penticton in the Okanagan Valley. They are a member of the Okanagan Nation Alliance. It has an accredited High School.

Indian Reserves
Indian Reserves under the administration of the band are:
Penticton Indian Reserve No. 1, at the south end of Okanagan Lake, 18539.80 ha.
Penticton Indian Reserve No. 2, between Okanagan and Dog (Skaha) Lakes, 13.10 ha.
Penticton Indian Reserve No. 3A, west of and adjoining IR No. 1, 5 miles southwest of Summerland, 145.70 ha.

See also
Okanagan people

References

Syilx governments
Okanagan